Gahnia lacera is a tussock-forming perennial in the family Cyperaceae, that is native to parts of the North Island of New Zealand.

References

lacera
Plants described in 1855
Flora of New Zealand
Taxa named by Ernst Gottlieb von Steudel